Enzo Knol (born Enzo Knol  , 8 June 1993) is a Dutch  video blogger on YouTube with over 2.65 million subscribers.

Enzo Knol published his first video on 9 June 2013. In early 2014 he gained attention with a video blog in which he broke his arm. His brother Milan Knol is also a YouTube vlogger. 

Enzo also has a gaming Youtube channel where he posts lots of different gaming videos. Gaming with other Dutch content creators such as Royalistiq, Qucee and his brother Milan.

Filmography

References

1993 births
Living people
Video bloggers
Dutch YouTubers
People from Assen